Håkavik is a village in Akershus, Norway. It is perhaps most famous for lending its name to the eponymous power station in neighboring Buskerud.

Villages in Akershus